Alfrēds Kalniņš (30 August 1894 – 4 May 1960) was a Latvian racewalker. He competed in the men's 10 kilometres walk at the 1924 Summer Olympics.

References

External links
 

1894 births
1960 deaths
Athletes (track and field) at the 1924 Summer Olympics
Latvian male racewalkers
Olympic athletes of Latvia
Place of birth missing